is a Japanese manga series written and illustrated by Fumitaka Katō. It was serialized in Kodansha's seinen manga magazine Weekly Young Magazine from December 2020 to November 2021, with its chapters collected in three tankōbon volumes.

Publication
Written and illustrated by Fumitaka Katō, Sanzennenme no Kamitaiō was serialized in Kodansha's seinen manga magazine Weekly Young Magazine from December 21, 2020, to November 22, 2021. Kodansha collected its chapters in three tankōbon volumes, released from June 4, 2021, to February 4, 2022.

In France, the manga has been licensed by Michel Lafon.

Volume list

References

External links
 

Kodansha manga
Romantic comedy anime and manga
Seinen manga